This article lists important figures and events in Malaysian public affairs during the year 1973, together with births and deaths of notable Malaysians.

Incumbent political figures

Federal level
Yang di-Pertuan Agong: Sultan Abdul Halim Muadzam Shah
Raja Permaisuri Agong: Sultanah Bahiyah
Prime Minister: Tun Abdul Razak
Deputy Prime Minister: 
Tun Dr Ismail (until 2 August)
Dato' Hussein Onn (from 3 August)
Lord President: Mohamed Azmi Mohamed

State level
 Sultan of Johor: Sultan Ismail
 Sultan of Kedah: Tengku Abdul Malik (Regent)
 Sultan of Kelantan: Sultan Yahya Petra (Deputy Yang di-Pertuan Agong)
 Raja of Perlis: Tuanku Syed Putra
 Sultan of Perak: Sultan Idris Shah II
 Sultan of Pahang: Sultan Abu Bakar
 Sultan of Selangor: Sultan Salahuddin Abdul Aziz Shah
 Sultan of Terengganu: Sultan Ismail Nasiruddin Shah
 Yang di-Pertuan Besar of Negeri Sembilan: Tuanku Jaafar
 Yang di-Pertua Negeri (Governor) of Penang: Tun Syed Sheikh Barabakh
 Yang di-Pertua Negeri (Governor) of Malacca: Tun Haji Abdul Aziz bin Abdul Majid
 Yang di-Pertua Negeri (Governor) of Sarawak: Tun Tuanku Bujang Tuanku Othman
 Yang di-Pertua Negeri (Governor) of Sabah:
Tun Pengiran Ahmad Raffae (until March)
Tun Fuad Stephens (from March)

Events
February – KFC Malaysia opened its first restaurant at Jalan Tuanku Abdul Rahman, Kuala Lumpur.
7–8 February – A Malay farmer Idrus bin Hassan killed eight people and wounded four others in Batu Titian Akar near Rembau, Negeri Sembilan, before being shot dead by police. 
21 May – Official opening of the Rantau Panjang – Sungai Golok Bridge of Malaysia-Thailand border in Kelantan. 
29 May – P. Ramlee, singer and actor, died at the age of 44 from a heart attack. He was buried at Jalan Ampang Muslim Cemetery, Kuala Lumpur. 
2 July – Social Security Organisation (SOCSO) established.
22 June - A grenade exploded on a Butterworth-bound train pulling into the Batu Gajah railway station, killing 2, including a soldier and injuring 11.
6 July – Official opening of the Kuala Lumpur Hilton by Prime Minister Tun Abdul Razak.
1 August – The 25th anniversary of the World Health Organization (WHO) was celebrated.
2 August – Tun Dr Ismail the deputy prime minister died due to heart attack. He was buried in Makam Pahlawan, near Masjid Negara, Kuala Lumpur. He was the first national leader to be laid to rest here.
3 August – Dato' Hussein Onn was elected as the deputy prime minister.
15 September – The 50th anniversary of the International Criminal Police Organization (Interpol) was celebrated.
1 October – Malaysia Airline System was established.
18 October – 42 people, mostly Indians, were crushed to death when a 200-foot-long limestone slab fell off a cliff, collapsed and crashed onto a village at Gunung Cheroh, Ipoh, Perak.
21 October – A peace declaration was signed between the Malaysian government and the North Kalimantan Communist Party (NKCP) at Simanggang, Sarawak. After the signing, the district and division of Simanggang were later renamed Sri Aman ("town of peace").
22 October -Detective Sergeant Chong Kek Oh was shot  dead by communist gunmens at Sungai Siput, Perak.
27 December - M.V Pulau Kidjang. Sarawak's worst maritime tragedies. Sarawak Titanic

Births
 22 March – Tuanku Zara Salim Davidson, Raja Permaisuri of Perak
 22 August – Roslina Bakar, sport shooter
Unknown date – Angie Cheung, Malaysian actress and former Miss Chinese Malaysia

Deaths
8 April – Tengku Ampuan Jemaah of Selangor, Second Raja Permaisuri Agong 
29 May – Tan Sri P. Ramlee, actor, singer, director, musician
2 August – Tun Dr. Ismail Abdul Rahman, 2nd Deputy Prime Minister of Malaysia
23 October – Tan Sri Zainal Abidin Ahmad (Za'aba), Malay writer and linguist

See also
 1972 in Malaysia | 1974 in Malaysia
 History of Malaysia

References 

 
Years of the 20th century in Malaysia
Malaysia
Malaysia
1970s in Malaysia